Heatherella is a genus of mites placed in its own family, Heatherellidae, in the order Mesostigmata. Heatherella contains two recognized species:

 Heatherella acanthocharis Walter, 1997
 Heatherella callimaulos Walter, 1997

References

Mesostigmata